Eric Montgomery Andrews (1933–2001), also known as E. M. Andrews, was an Australian historian, academic and author. He was born in London and gained his first degree at the University of Oxford. He completed a Doctor of Philosophy at the Australian National University and taught history at the University of Newcastle from 1967.

Andrews' book Isolationism and Appeasement in Australia: Reactions to the European Crises, 1935–1939 has been quoted in the Australian Capital Territory Legislative Assembly.

Bibliography

Books
 
 
 
 
 
 Also published in Chinese as:

References

External links
Newcastle War Society and Culture Symposium, 2 November 2001 – Wayne Reynolds (University of Newcastle): A Scholar of Australian War and Diplomacy: The Views and Methods of Eric Andrews

1933 births
2001 deaths
Alumni of the University of Oxford
20th-century Australian historians
Australian National University alumni
Academic staff of the University of Newcastle (Australia)